is a Japanese swimmer. He competed in the men's 200 metre backstroke event at the 2016 Summer Olympics.

References

External links
 

1992 births
Living people
Japanese male backstroke swimmers
Olympic swimmers of Japan
Swimmers at the 2016 Summer Olympics
Place of birth missing (living people)
Medalists at the FINA World Swimming Championships (25 m)
Asian Games medalists in swimming
Asian Games silver medalists for Japan
Swimmers at the 2018 Asian Games
Medalists at the 2018 Asian Games
21st-century Japanese people